The WCT Tallinn Masters Mixed Doubles is an annual mixed doubles curling tournament on the ISS Mixed Doubles World Curling Tour. It is held annually at the Tondiraba Ice Hall in Tallinn, Estonia.

The purse for the event is €3,325 and its event categorization is 300 (highest calibre is 1000). The winning team wins €1,200.

The event began as a Champions Curling Tour event in 2017, and has been part of the World Curling Tour since 2018.

For local teams, the event serves as a preparation for the Estonian Mixed Doubles Curling Championship, with the winner qualifying to represent Estonia at the World Mixed Doubles Curling Championship. The 2022 event only had teams from Estonia, Lithuania and Finland.

Past champions

References

World Curling Tour events
Champions Curling Tour events
Curling competitions in Estonia
Sports competitions in Tallinn
Mixed doubles curling